The Jabiru J170 is an Australian ultralight and light-sport aircraft, designed and produced by Jabiru Aircraft. The aircraft is supplied as a kit for amateur construction or as a complete ready-to-fly-aircraft.

Design and development
The J170 was derived from the Jabiru J160, by using the J160 fuselage and the wings from the Jabiru J430 plus a bigger elevator to give it a better rate of climb at higher density altitudes. The J170 features a strut-braced high-wing with winglets, a two-seats-in-side-by-side configuration enclosed cockpit, fixed tricycle landing gear and a single engine in tractor configuration.

The aircraft is made from composites. The standard engine available is the  Jabiru 2200 four-stroke powerplant.

The J170 complies with both the US light-sport rules and United Kingdom BCAR Section "S" requirements. In Canada it qualifies as an Advanced Ultralight at a gross weight of

Specifications (J170)

References

External links

2000s Australian ultralight aircraft
Homebuilt aircraft
Light-sport aircraft
Single-engined tractor aircraft
J170
High-wing aircraft